Following is a list of Irish-themed restaurants operating in the United States:

 Beef O'Brady's
 Bennigan's
 Dorrian's Red Hand Restaurant, New York City
 Kells Irish Pub, Portland, Oregon, U.S.
 Kildare's Irish Pub
 McSorley's Old Ale House
 O'Neill's, United Kingdom
 Raven & Rose, Portland, Oregon

 
Irish